Helpless Romantic is the sixth studio album by Jon B. It was released on October 28, 2008. It's his second and final album for the independent record label Arsenal Records, following the Christmas album Holiday Wishes: From Me to You in 2006. Helpless Romantic was a concept album that revolved around his recent marriage to his new wife. The album was recorded at Vibezelect Studios in Pasadena, California, his personal recording studio/record label.

Track listing

 All songs written by Jonathan Buck, unless otherwise noted.

 "Ooh So Sexy" (featuring Paul Wall) (Jonathan Buck, Mr. Lee, Kevin Buck, Derek "Sincere" Pomier) (4:31)
 "It's U" (Jonathan Buck, Joaquin Bynum) (3:33)
 "Get What You Want" (4:26)
 "Helpless Romantic Interlude" (Jonathan Buck, Danette Buck) (0:32)
 "Helpless Romantic" (Jonathan Buck, Joaquin Bynum) (3:46)
 "Paradise in U" (5:44)
 "Drops of Rain" (3:31)
 "Need it Badd" (3:32)
 "On & On" (Emile Ghantous, Erik Nelson, Jonathan Buck, D. Simmons, L. Harris) (3:56)
 "Everybody Here Wants You" (Jeff Buckley) (4:44)
 "Ride of Our Lives" (featuring Jonesii) (Jonathan Buck, Denaine Jones) (5:06)
 "Won't You Say Yeah" (Jonathan Buck, Joaquin Bynum) (3:45)
 "Part of U" (Jonathan Buck, Tim Kobza) (3:40)
 "In too Deep" (6:29)

Personnel
 Drum programming: Jon B., Joaquin Bynum, Mr. Lee, Insomniax
 Live Drums: Jon B. on "Everybody Here Wants You"
 Keyboards: Jon B., Joaquin Bynum, Mr. Lee, Insomniax
 Guitar: Tim Kobza
 Bass: Kevin Buck on "Ooh So Sexy", D-Mak on "Get What You Want", Tim Kobza on "Everybody Here Wants You"
 Trumpet: Cornet Tyrone Griffen on "Get What You Want"
 Background vocals: Jon B., Joaquin Bynum, Insominax, Jonesii
 Mixing: Jim Jonsin, Jim Caruana, Dan Naim, Jon B., KD
 Mastering: Stephen Marsh
 Executive producer: Jon B., Max Gousse, Ozz Saturne
 Photography: Kawai Matthews
 Art direction and design: Airphilosophy.com

References

https://web.archive.org/web/20080926171305/http://d2c.m.getmusic.com/artist/catalog/default/list?path=%2Flive%2Fartists%2Fj%2Fjon_b

External links 

2008 albums
Jon B. albums